He Stayed for Breakfast is a 1940 American romantic comedy film directed by Alexander Hall, based on the 1934 play Ode to Liberty by Sidney Howard, itself adapted from the French play Liberté provisoire by Michel Duran.

Plot 
In Paris, Marianne meets a communist named Paul who is attempting to hide in her apartment to avoid the law. Interested in the man, she lets him take refuge in her place. Marianne soon finds out that Paul attempted to assassinate her banker husband, Maurice. Paul becomes trapped in the apartment due to guards surrounding the building.

Paul and Marianne slowly fall in love. Their newfound love becomes endangered when Paul is asked to surrender himself by the communist party he is involved with, but knowing blame would be placed on Marianne, he refuses. Paul is then shortly after discovered by Marianne's husband, who turns him over to the police. To get the charges dropped, Marianne agrees to stay with her husband, but this does not last long, as Marianne, annoyed by her husband, flees to Paul's. The couple then head for the United States.

Cast 
 Loretta Young as Marianne Duval
 Melvyn Douglas as Paul Boliet
 Alan Marshal as Andre Dorlay
 Eugene Pallette as Maurice Duval
 Una O'Connor as Doreta
 Curt Bois as Comrade Tronavich
 Leonid Kinskey as Comrade Nicky
 Trevor Bradette as police lieutenant
 Grady Sutton as salesman
 Frank Sully as butcher
 Evelyn Young as secretary
 Ethelreda Leopold as secretary
Uncredited:
 Ernie Adams as Workman
 George Beranger as Maitre d'hotel
 William Castle as Policeman
 Vernon Dent as Chef
 Lenard Mudie as communist secretary
 William Newell as waiter
 Nestor Paiva as gendarme
 Harry Semels as comrade
 Charles Wagenheim as timid waiter
 Frederick Worlock as communist president

Reception
Variety gave a lukewarm review: 
Lacking a sustained pace, and with several slow spots that might have been lifted by better direction, picture will roll through the key spots as bill topper for moderately satisfactory biz. ... With most of the action confined to the apartment, picture has its weak moments with series of repetitious happenings that might not be so apparent with better direction that would have smacked over toppers to the gags and situations at hand. These rather dull passages  prove a burden to the bright and sparkling comedy that is liberally sprinkled throughout, and prevent the picture from reaching the laugh hit class.

The Los Angeles Times stated, "It may lack the ideal smoothness of the Ernst Lubitsch production as a comedy: but its hilarities are immense."

References

External links
 
 
 
 

1940 films
1940 romantic comedy films
1940s American films
1940s English-language films
American black-and-white films
American films based on plays
American romantic comedy films
Columbia Pictures films
Films directed by Alexander Hall
Films set in Paris